South Dakota Amendment C of 2006 is an amendment to the South Dakota Constitution to make it unconstitutional for the state to recognize or perform same-sex marriages, or to recognize civil unions, domestic partnerships, or other quasi-marital relationships regardless of gender.  The referendum was approved on 7 November 2006 by 52% of the state's voters.

The text of the adopted amendment states:
Only marriage between a man and a woman shall be valid or recognized in South Dakota. The uniting of two or more persons in a civil union, domestic partnership, or other quasi-marital relationship shall not be valid or recognized in South Dakota.

The amendment was rendered void by Obergefell v. Hodges, a US Supreme Court decision that legalized same-sex marriage nationwide.

See also
 LGBT rights in South Dakota

References

External links
 The Money Behind the 2006 Marriage Amendments  OpenSecrets

LGBT in South Dakota
U.S. state constitutional amendments banning same-sex unions
South Dakota law
South Dakota Amendment C
South Dakota Amendment C
Amendment C
Same-sex marriage ballot measures in the United States